Sideritis barbellata  is a small erect shrub, laxly branched, whitish-yellow tomentose. Leaves are generally green-glabrescent above, ovate-lanceolate, the base cordiform. Inflorescences are erect, verticillasters, branched with 1–3 series of sterile bracts subtending the branches, and with slightly curved flowers.

Distribution
Endemic to the Canary Island of La Palma: Throughout the island, principally in pine and thermophyle forest zones 200–1500 m. Fuencaliente de La Palma, Tigalate, Mazo, Barranco del Rio, Gallegos, Izcagua, El Pinar, Barranco de las Angustias, La Cumbrecita, Bejenado etc.

References 

 David Bramwell and Zoë Bramwell. Wild Flowers of the Canary Islands. Editorial Rueda, Madrid, España. 2001.

External links
 Photo: Sideritis barbellata, henriettesherbal.com
 Sideritis barbellata Mend.-Heuer, theplantlist.org

barbellata
Endemic flora of the Canary Islands
Flora of the Canary Islands
Endemic flora of Macaronesia
Plants described in 1974